The Shelters of Stone is a historical fiction novel by Jean M. Auel published in April 2002. It is the sequel to The Plains of Passage – published 12 years earlier – and fifth in the Earth's Children series. It describes the return of Jondalar to his homeland along with Ayla.

Plot summary
Central to this book is the tension created by Ayla's healing art, her pregnancy, and the acceptance of her by Jondalar's people, the Zelandonii. Ayla was raised by Clan Neanderthals, known as "flatheads" to the Zelandonii and viewed as no better than animals. For the Zelandonii to accept Ayla they must first overcome their prejudice against the Neanderthals. Luckily for Ayla and Jondalar, some of the higher-ranking Zelandonii already have doubts of this misjudgment.

Two of their number, Echozar and Brukeval, are of partial Neanderthal ancestry and are ashamed of it. Echozar at least is pacified by Ayla's own story and by his (Echozar's) own marriage to Joplaya, Jondalar's close-cousin (half-sister). Brukeval, on the other hand, rejects his heritage utterly and refuses to listen to reason.

Jondalar's first romantic interest, Zelandoni, formerly known as Zolena, has now become the First among the spiritual leaders. She supports adopting Ayla into their society, if not least for the healing arts she brings to the cave, although Ayla also must overcome the feeling that she is uncomfortable with a full connection with the spirit world. After Ayla helps a mortally injured hunter live long enough to see his mate, the First senses that Ayla needs to be brought into the fold of the Zelandonia (mystics, named after their culture so as to identify themselves with it) so that she will be accepted as a healer by all the people of the cave.

At one point, Ayla persuades the native mothers to nurse a neglected infant, on the pretext that even a "flathead" would have done so in their place. This both shames them into agreeing (as noted by Jondalar's sister-in-law, Proleva) and educates the Zelandonii in the ways of their ex-neighbors.

Ayla is drawn ever closer to an as-yet-undetermined role in the Ninth Cave of the Zelandonii. Her knowledge of the healing arts as well as hunting force her to accept a role in the spiritual leadership of the group.

Through it all Jondalar is waiting for the summer meeting and matrimonial that will finally "tie the knot" for the two of them. This has been his ultimate goal since The Valley of Horses. Their daughter, Jonayla--named for her mother's belief that a man's "essence" creates babies, which leads to Jondalar and Ayla each being part of the baby, not just their spirits--is born sometime after this event. Not long after the birth, Ayla finally decides to become Zelandoni's acolyte, if only so that the members of the Zelandonii will accept her as a healer.

This book is set in what is now the Vézère valley, near to Les Eyzies, in the Dordogne, southwest France. It was relatively densely populated in prehistoric times, with many open cliff-top dwellings that can still be seen, some of which have been turned into tourist attractions. The national museum of prehistory is located in this valley. Ayla also discovers the world-famous cave of Lascaux, which her adopted people subsequently paint.

Character list

Ninth cave of the Zelandonii
 Ayla - of the Ninth Cave of the Zelandonii, formerly Ayla of the Lion Camp of the Mamutoi, Daughter of the Mammoth Hearth, Chosen by the Spirit of the Cave Lion, Protected by the Cave Bear, Friend of the horses, Whinney and Racer, and the four-legged hunter, Wolf              
 Jondalar - of the Ninth Cave of the Zelandonii, Ayla's intended mate, son of former leader, brother of leader, called Jonde by his sister Folara       
 Zelandoni - (Zolena) Current Zelandoni, former lover of Jondalar         
 Thonolan/d - Jondalar's younger brother, killed on Journey          
 Folara - Jondalar's younger sister             
 Marthona - Jondalar's mother, former leader, also mother of Joharran, Folara, Thonolan       
 Willomar - Marthona's mate, Trade Master, Traveler           
 Tivonan - Willomar's apprentice trader             
 Joconan/d - Marthona's first mate, dead, man of Joharran's hearth        
 Joharran - Jondalar's older brother, leader of Ninth Cave         
 Proleva - Joharran's mate              
 Jaradal - Proleva's son, Joharran's hearth child           
 Levela - Proleva's younger sister, Jondecam's mate           
 Jondecam - Levela's mate, nephew of Kimeran and son of Zelandoni of the Second Cave   
 Velima - mother of Proleva and Levela           
 Solaban - Hunter, adviser, and friend of Joharran          
 Ramara - Solaban's mate              
 Robenan - Ramara's son              
 Rushemar - Hunter, adviser, and friend of Joharran          
 Salova - Rushemar's mate              
 Marsola - Salova's daughter              
 Marona - Jondalar's former girlfriend             
 Wylopa - Marona's cousin              
 Portula - Marona's friend              
 Lorava - Portula's younger sister             
 Ramila - Folara's friend              
 Galeya - Folara's friend              
 Charezal - New member of Ninth Cave, stranger to Jondalar        
 Shevonar/d - Man who dies while hunting           
 Relona - Shevonar's mate              
 Ranokol - Shevonar's brother              
 Brukeval - Jondalar's distant cousin (part Clan)           
 Madroman - Formerly called Ladroman, acolyte of Fifth Cave         
 Laramar - Man who makes barma            
 Tremeda - Laramar's mate              
 Bologan - son of Tremeda, eldest, twelve           
 Lanoga - daughter of Tremeda, ten            
 Lorala - daughter of Tremeda, about six months          
 Stelona - Older woman who nurses Lorala           
 Thefona - Third Cave's best lookout, best vision          
 Thevola - Maker of rawhide panels            
 Lanidar - Boy of the Nineteenth Cave with deformed right arm
 Mardena - Lanidar's mother              
 Denoda - Mardena's mother              
 Janida - Peridal's mate              
 Peridal - Janida's mate              
 Matagan - Young man who was gored by a woolly rhinoceros       
 Tishona - Marsheval's mate              
 Marsheval - Tishona's mate              
 Palidar - Tivonan's friend              
 Whinney - Ayla's horse, dun-yellow mare, Przwalski horse
 Racer - Jondalar's horse, bay (brown) stallion, Cherski horse (rare)        
 Wolf - Ayla's wolf

Leaders
 Manvelar - Leader of Third Cave, Two Rivers Rock             
 Morizan - Son of Manvelar's mate, son of his hearth            
 Kareja - Leader of Eleventh Cave, River Place              
 Dorova - Kareja's mother                  
 Brameval - Leader of Fourteenth Cave, Little Valley              
 Kimeran - Leader of Second Cave of the Zelandonii, Elder Hearth, brother of         
 Zelandoni - of the Second Cave, uncle of Jondecam             
 Denanna - Leader of the three holdings of the Twenty-ninth Cave, Three Rocks, and specifically of the South Holding, Reflection Rock 
 Tormaden - Leader of the Nineteenth Cave of the Zelandonii

Zelandonia
 Zelandoni - of the Eleventh Cave, River Place, homosexual man 
 Marolan man who is the Eleventh's friend and mate 
 Zelandoni - of the Third Cave, Two Rivers Rock, older man 
 Zelandoni - of the Fourteenth Cave, Little Valley, middle-aged woman 
 Zelandoni - of the Second Cave, Elder Hearth, older sister of Kimeran, mother of Jondecam 
 Zelandoni - of the Seventh Cave, Horsehead Rock, white-haired grandfather of Zelandoni Second, and Kimeran 
 Zelandoni - of the Nineteenth Cave, white-haired older woman 
 Zelandoni - of the Fifth Cave, Old Valley, middle-aged man 
 Zelandoni - of the Twenty-ninth Cave, Three Rocks, and mediator between the three assistant zelandonia and three leaders of the three separate locations of the Twenty-ninth Cave
 Assistant Zelandoni of the Twenty-ninth Cave, Zelandoni of Reflection Rock (South Holding), middle-aged man
 Assistant Zelandoni of the Twenty-ninth Cave, Zelandoni of South Face (North Holding), young man
 Assistant Zelandoni of the Twenty-ninth Cave, Zelandoni of Summer Camp (West Holding), middle-aged woman
 First Acolyte of the Second Cave (almost Zelandoni), young woman 
 Jonokol - First Acolyte of the Ninth Cave, artist, young man 
 Mikolan - Second Acolyte of the Fourteenth Cave, very young man 
 Mejera - Acolyte of the Third Cave (formerly Fourteenth Cave), very young woman 
 Madroman - Acolyte of the Fifth Cave (formerly Ladroman of the Ninth Cave), young man

First Cave of the Lanzadonii (Dalanar's cave)
 Dalanar - Man of Jondalar's hearth, Marthona's former mate, founder of the Lanzadonii
 Jerika - Dalanar's mate, co-founder of Lanzadonii 
 Ahnlay/d - Jerika's mother, died 
 Hochaman - Man of Jerika's hearth, Great Traveler 
 Joplaya - Jerika's daughter, daughter of Dalanar's hearth 
 Echozar - Joplaya's half-Clan mate 
 Andovan/d - Man who helped raise Echozar 
 Yoma/d - Echozar's mother, Clan woman

References

External links
 

2002 American novels
Earth's Children